The 2016 NCAA Division III baseball tournament was played at the end of the 2016 NCAA Division III baseball season to determine the 41st national champion of college baseball at the NCAA Division III level. The tournament concluded with eight teams competing at Neuroscience Group Field at Fox Cities Stadium in Grand Chute, Wisconsin for the championship. Eight regional tournaments were held to determine the participants in the World Series. Regional tournaments were contested in double-elimination format, with four regions consisting of six teams, and four consisting of eight, for a total of 56 teams participating in the tournament.

Bids
The 56 competing teams were:

By team

By conference

Regionals
''Bold indicates winner.

South Regional
William R. Bowdoin Field-Mount Berry, GA (Host: Berry College)

New York Regional
Leo Pinckney Field at Falcon Park-Auburn, NY (Host: State University of New York at Cortland)

West Regional
Avista Stadium-Spokane, WA (Host: Whitworth University/Spokane Sports Commission)

Midwest Regional
Copeland Park-La Crosse, WI (Host: University of Wisconsin-La Crosse)

Mid-Atlantic Regional
PNC Field-Moosic, PA (Host: Misericordia University)

New England Regional
Eastern Baseball Stadium-Mansfield, CT (Host: Eastern Connecticut State University)

Central Regional
GCS Ballpark-Sauget, IL (Host: Webster College)

Mideast Regional
Ross Memorial Park-Washington, PA (Host: Washington & Jefferson College)

World Series
Neuroscience Group Field at Fox Cities Stadium-Grand Chute, WI (Host: University of Wisconsin-Oshkosh/Lawrence University/Fox Cities Convention and Visitors Bureau)

References

NCAA Division III Baseball Tournament
Tournament
NCAA Division III baseball tournament